Paul Falck Hagen (19 March 1920 – 19 May 2003) was a Danish film and television actor. He appeared in more than 100 films between 1952 and 1999. He is most known for playing Mr. Clausen in the television series Huset på Christianshavn, which aired between 1970 and 1977.

He was born in Copenhagen, and died in Nakskov, Denmark. He is buried in Langø cemetery on Lolland island where he lived the last years of his life.

Filmography

Far betaler – 1946
Avismanden – 1952
Ta' Pelle med – 1952
Kærlighedsdoktoren – 1952
Far til fire – 1953
Sønnen – 1953
I kongens klær – 1954
Sukceskomponisten – 1954
Jan går til filmen – 1954
En sømand går i land – 1954
Arvingen – 1954
Det var på Rundetårn – 1955
Hvad vil De ha'? – 1956
Kristiane af Marstal – 1956
Taxa K-1640 Efterlyses – 1956
Tre piger fra Jylland – 1957
Natlogi betalt – 1957
Tag til marked i Fjordby – 1957
Jeg elsker dig – 1957
Verdens rigeste pige – 1958
Seksdagesløbet – 1958
Soldaterkammerater – 1958
Poeten og Lillemor – 1959
Soldaterkammerater rykker ud – 1959
Soldaterkammerater på vagt – 1960
Gymnasiepigen – 1960
Peters baby – 1961
Een blandt mange – 1961
Støv på hjernen – 1961
Soldaterkammerater på efterårsmanøvre – 1961
Den grønne elevator – 1961
Eventyr på Mallorca – 1961
Den hvide hingst – 1961
To skøre ho'der – 1961
Prinsesse for en dag – 1962
Soldaterkammerater på sjov – 1962
Det støver stadig – 1962
Det tossede paradis – 1962
Frk. Nitouche – 1963
Bussen – 1963
Tre piger i Paris – 1963
Hvad med os? – 1963
Pigen og pressefotografen – 1963
Støv for alle pengene – 1963
Et døgn uden løgn – 1963
Hvis lille pige er du? – 1963
Majorens oppasser – 1964
Mord for åbent tæppe – 1964
Selvmordsskolen – 1964
Sommer i Tyrol – 1964
Passer passer piger – 1965
Mor bag rattet – 1965
Flådens friske fyre – 1965
Pigen og millionæren – 1965
Jensen længe leve – 1965
Tre små piger – 1966
Soyas tagsten – 1966
Flagermusen (film) – 1966
Pigen og greven – 1966
Jeg - en elsker – 1966
Elsk din næste – 1967
Historien om Barbara – 1967
Jeg - en marki – 1967
Nyhavns glade gutter – 1967
Martha – 1967
Olsen-banden – 1968
Soldaterkammerater på bjørnetjeneste – 1968
Stormvarsel – 1968
Olsen-banden på spanden – 1969
Der kom en soldat – 1969
Den røde rubin – 1969
Kys til højre og venstre – 1969
Amour – 1970
Mazurka på sengekanten – 1970
Præriens skrappe drenge – 1970
Hurra for de blå husarer – 1970
Rend mig i revolutionen – 1970
Guld til præriens skrappe drenge – 1971
Tandlæge på sengekanten – 1971
Ballade på Christianshavn – 1971
Rektor på sengekanten – 1972
Motorvej på sengekanten – 1972
På'en igen Amalie – 1973
Romantik på sengekanten – 1973
Nøddebo Præstegård (1974) – 1974
Pigen og drømmeslottet – 1974
Piger i trøjen – 1975
Der må være en sengekant – 1975
Olsen-banden på sporet – 1975
Hopla på sengekanten – 1976
Sømænd på sengekanten – 1976
Olsen-banden deruda' – 1977
Agent 69 Jensen i Skyttens tegn – 1978
Attentat (film) – 1980
Danmark er lukket – 1980
Olsen-banden over alle bjerge – 1981
Walter og Carlo - op på fars hat – 1985
En verden til forskel – 1989
Casanova – 1990
Jesus vender tilbage – 1992
Krummerne 3 - Fars gode idé – 1994
Manden som ikke ville dø – 1999
Gøngehøvdingen – 1992

External links

1920 births
2003 deaths
Danish male film actors
Danish male television actors
Male actors from Copenhagen
People from Nakskov
20th-century Danish male actors